{{DISPLAYTITLE:C20H22O7}}
The molecular formula C20H22O7 (molar mass: 374.384 g/mol, exact mass: 374.1366 u) may refer to:

 Diffractaic acid
 Hydroxymatairesinol (HMR)
 Saudin
 Tinosporide

Molecular formulas